Disco polo is a genre of popular dance music, created in Poland in the 1980s. It was initially known as "sidewalk music" or "backyard music". This genre, being a part of the musical folklore, had great popularity in the 1990s, with its peak in 1995-1997. Then the genre gradually declined in popularity up to the early 21st century. The comeback of disco polo happened in the winter of 2007. The Polish PWN dictionary defines the genre as a Polish variant of disco music, with simple melodies and often ribald lyrics. The service Rate Your Music defines disco polo as a Polish variant of dance-pop.

Characteristics 
Classic disco polo songs are characterized by simple chord progressions and melodies, and take further influence from the steady rhythms found in folk music. These are often accompanied by syncopated samples of drums, synthesizers and keyboard instruments. The genre is dominated by compositions in the 4/4 time signature. Lyrics are often sentimental and playful, written around themes of love and sometimes holidays.

History

Roots of the genre 
The genre originates from music played at weddings by bands with a repertoire of Polish folk music and wedding songs. Later, electronic instruments were adopted over traditional acoustic instruments. The most common lyrical themes included melodramatic lyrics about unrequited love. The genre was additionally influenced by other popular music styles within Europe.

Pioneers of the genre include the band Bayer Full, which was founded on November 19, 1984, and Top One, formed in 1986.

In the late 1980s and early 1990s, more bands emerged, such as Akcent, Atlantis, Boys, and Fanatic. Blue Star, a record label in Reguły was the first official record label that published disco polo in Poland. This burgeoning style of music was coined by label owner Sławomir Skręta as piosenka chodnikowa, or "sidewalk music", which was a reference to the main means of distribution: records were sold primarily in stalls on streets and bazaars. Scenes were centered in Białystok and other cities in the province of Podlasie, with regional scenes in Żyrardów and Sochaczew. "Mydełko Fa" ("The Fa Soap"), recorded in 1991 by Marek Kondrat and Marlena Drozdowska, was created as a parody of the genre, but ended up popularising it further.

Sidewalk music was played in country picnics, county depots, weddings, as well as political campaigns for Polish parliament and presidential elections. Former president Aleksander Kwaśniewski was one of the most notable examples of politicians who used disco polo during his presidential campaign.

From the 1990s to 2002 

Skręta coined the name "disco polo" in 1993, taking influence from the name Italo disco. The name caught on and replaced "sidewalk music". On February 29, 1992, a TVP1 broadcast dedicated to disco polo named Gala Piosenki Chodnikowej i Popularnej (Gala of Sidewalk and Popular Songs) was held.

Disco polo was extensively marketed by the Polsat TV station, which produced its own disco polo hit list in several TV shows: Disco Relax (which premiered on December 4, 1994) and Disco Polo Live (which premiered February 3, 1996, in TV Polsat). The genre also found its way onto Radio Eska. Disco polo was also represented in Polonia 1, a network of local stations in urban areas, as well as TV Polonia. Disco polo was acknowledged by the mainstream media as a symbol of kitsch and primitivism.

Bands and singers used disco polo during the election campaigns. Traditional instruments came to be replaced by keyboards later in the '90s, which contributed to a slight change in style, making the songs more akin to Eurodance. Artists also started mixing disco polo with other musical genres such as dance music, house music, and techno.

TVP 1 aired a program of disco polo entitled Karnawałowa Gala Disco Polo ("Carnival Gala Disco Polo") on December 31, 1995.

In 1996, Maria Zmarz-Koczanowicz and Michał Arabudzkii directed a documentary film called Bara Bara, which explored the disco polo trend. It was aired in the same year on TVP1.

On April 24, 1998, a film was released by Robert Glinski Kochaj i rób co chcesz ("Love and do what you want"), in which the main character leaves to play this genre of music on the piano in a club.

The trend receded between 1997 and 2001. A sharp decline in sales of disco polo cassettes and CDs ensued due to the growth of Polish and foreign pop music, rock, hip hop, dance, and electronic music. Disco polo's airplay on Radio Eska, TV Polonia 1 and TV Polonia diminished. In late August 2002, Polsat TV cancelled "Disco Relax" and "Disco Polo Live," leaving many bands jobless. Some observers believe that the drastic decline in the popularity of the genre was in part caused by the emigration of disco polo musicians to the United States, where some artists continued their work.

After 2002 

From 2002–2007, several bands released new disco polo albums (e.g., Toples or Weekend), but the genre remained more of a niche.

On August 12, 2004, an article by Wojciech Orliński was published in Gazeta Wyborcza entitled Śmierć disco polo ("The death of disco polo") describing the decline of this musical genre at the turn of the 20th and 21st centuries.

On August 6, 2006, TVN aired a program called Kulisy sławy ("Behind the scenes of Fame") of the Uwaga! series, dedicated to the revival of the disco polo genre. This program was recognized as the best report of 2006 in an internet poll and was repeated on December 31.

In 2007, after a five-year hiatus, the genre once again established itself on television through the station iTV, finding itself on the daily broadcast called Discostacja every day. Promotion also took place on the internet through two internet radio stations. Started in 2007, disco polo bands began gigging again.

July 5, 2008 saw disco polo shows Nie tylko Barachołka ("More than just Barachołka"), formerly known as "Barachołka", returning to Polskie Radio Lublin. It is broadcast between 9 PM and 2 AM from Friday to Saturday.

In the first half of 2009, disco polo music was promoted by the Edusat channel for three months.

Since March 2009, the iTV television broadcast resumed the program Disco Polo Live from several years ago, although the broadcast was suspended in March 2011. From May 7, 2011, Disco Polo Live program is now broadcast on Polo TV.

On October 4, 2009, a new program produced by Maciej Jamróz by the name of Disco Bandżo was featured on Tele 5, which lasts approximately 50 minutes. Currently, the program is broadcast every morning on Polonia 1.

From December 5, 2010, on the channel VIVA Polska a dance music program called Disco ponad wszystko ("Disco above all") aired every Sunday. This program doubled the viewership of the channel and after each subsequent episode the viewership steadily increased, but was removed after a period of eighteen months from the channel. CSB TV also broadcast disco polo, but the channel was discontinued in May 2012. On May 7, 2011, a television channel dedicated primarily to disco polo music – Polo TV was launched.

Since December 19, 2011, the channel was broadcast on digital TV and the multiplex and had become the most watched music channel in Poland. On September 27, 2011, the channel TV.DISCO was launched, which broadcast the genre next to disco, dance music and electronic music, which has stayed on air until the present day (as of January 2015). The program Disco Relax, which aired in the 90s on Polsat, was meant to be resumed on this channel, but eventually returned on February 12, 2012 on Polo TV.

On October 20, 2012, the program Vipo Disco Polo Hits led by Wojciech Grodzki moved from the TVS channel to Polo TV. It was aired every Saturday at 10.00 am until December 30, 2017.

In 2011, director Maciej Bochniak produced a documentary entitled Miliard Szczęśliwych Ludzi ("A Billion Happy People") about the travels of Bayer Full and their performances in China.

On December 1, 2012, Polsat launched a new program dedicated to the music of disco polo entitled Imperium Disco Polo ("Disco Polo Empire"), these are re-runs from Polsat Play. However, at the beginning of March 2013 the program was taken off the Polsat channel, due to the emergence of new episodes of the series Pamiętniki z Wakacji, but new episodes are still available in cable networks and digital platforms of the channel Polsat Play. From April 21, 2013 to June 2013, this program was aired on ATM Rozrywka, and from August 3, 2013 is shown on Polsat 2 at 2:00 am.

From April 8 to December 1, 2013, disco polo was promoted by Radio Plus, which changed its slogan from Łagodne Przeboje ("Gentle hits") to Zawsze w Rytmie ("Always in Rhythm"). In addition to streaming disco polo, there were also dance songs from the 80s and 90s. From 1 December 2013 this music had been moved to the radio VOX FM. This change was due to protests from listeners of Radio Plus and bishops who were the owners of licenses on Radio Plus.

On August 17, 2013, Telewizja Polsat broadcast a concert named Disco Pod Żaglami ("Disco Sailing") featuring the disco polo stars Akcent, Shazza, Boys, Classic and Weekend. This was the first disco polo concert since the removal of programs of this genre in the station for over 10 years, and it was viewed by 2.7 million people.

On May 1, 2014, another TV channel dedicated to disco polo was launched, named Disco Polo Music, belonging to Telewizja Polsat.

In early February 2015, the channel TV.DISCO completely removed disco polo music from its schedule.

On February 27, 2015, Maciej Bochniak's film "Disco Polo" hit movie theatres, which tells the story of a group of musicians who got to the top of the Disco Polo charts. On February 26, 2015, in connection with the release of this film, an episode of Hala odlotów ("Waiting area") aired that day on TVP Kultura, dedicated to disco polo.

On December 4, 2017, as a result of an agreement with the ZPR Media group, Telewizja Polsat acquired 100% of the shares in Lemon Records, the broadcaster of disco polo stations Polo TV and Vox Music TV, thus becoming the owner of both.

The two most popular Polish songs on YouTube are of the disco polo genre. For a long time, the first most viewed song was Ona tańczy dla mnie ("She dances for me") by Weekend. At the end of June 2017, achieving over 106 million views, the song Przez twe oczy zielone ("Because of your green eyes") by Akcent beat the record of most viewed Polish song, bumping Weekend down to second place.

After 2002, this genre is often combined with dance music and other genres of electronic dance music, e.g. power dance, eurodance, nu-electro and techno. After 2002, songs of this genre often also contain elements of folk music and pop music. The bands and artists which gained significant popularity after 2002 are, among others: After Party, Weekend, Andre, Czadoman, Tomasz Niecik, Eva Basta, Masters, DJ Disco ft. MC Polo, Cliver, Effect and Power Play. Disco polo is also popular outside of Poland, especially within the Polish diaspora. There are artists, such as Disco Polo Tomek, who perform disco polo music. Recently, the disco polo genre has seen a new revival in Poland after the 2016 New Year's Eve party, when the TV channel TVP2 invited the frontman of Akcent, Zenon Martyniuk, one of the most popular disco polo performers, to perform on the main stage. The president of Polish television Jacek Kurski has also expressed his joy at the fact that disco polo is no longer ironically hated as the performance was enjoyed by many people present at the event.

The genre in Polish mass media 

From the mid-90s to the turn of the century, television and radio programs devoted to the music of disco polo were broadcast by Polsat stations, Radio Eska, Polonia 1, TV Polonia, and some regional radio stations and local cable networks. Since 2007, interest in disco polo has grown, which is reflected in a greater presence of this music in some media and the increased amount of concerts played. However, the genre is still considered a symbol of bad taste by many radio stations and television channels and is not promoted by them.

After 2007, TV stations that promoted or promote disco polo include Polo TV, iTV, Polsat 2, TVS, Polonia 1, Disco Polo Music, TVR, VOX Music TV, Power TV, Polsat Play, Eska TV, TV.DISCO, VIVA Polska, Polsat, Puls 2, Tele 5, ATM Rozrywka, Kino Polska Muzyka, as well as TV4 and TV6. This genre is also promoted by some radio stations and internet sites such as Radio FTB, Discoparty.pl, Disco-Polo.fm, Discostacja and IRN, as well as regional stations – including Radio Express, Radio Hit Radio Jard, Radio Kaszëbë, Polish Radio Kielce, Radio Leliwa, Polskie Radio Lublin, Radio Silesia and Radio Plus, as well as transregional stations radio VOX FM and radio WAWA. Online social video services such as YouTube and the site Wrzuta.pl, which existed from 2006 to 2017, also had significant influence on the return of mass interest in disco polo.

In the summer, several disco polo festivals take place, of which the largest since 1996 is National Festival of Music and Dance in Ostróda (originally held in Koszalin), and from 2011 is Disco Hit Festival - Kobylnica, in Kwakowo near Kobylnica. The biggest stars of the Polish dance music perform in these festivals and thousands of fans attend from all over Poland. Bands and performers of disco polo also participate in many charity concerts and events including during the Wielka Orkiestra Świątecznej Pomocy (Great Orchestra of Christmas Charity). At the end of 2016 and beginning of 2017, for the first time a star band of disco polo, Akcent (Zenon Martyniuk and Ryszard Warot) performed at New Year's in Zakopane, organised by Telewizja Polska. TVP2 also acquired the rights to broadcast the "25 years of disco polo" gala, which took place on June 25, 2017 at the stadium of Warsaw Polonia. According to the Nielsen Audience Measurement, the "25 years of disco polo" gala on TVP2 was viewed by 2.6 million viewers.

Additional information 
 The promotion of disco polo in Poland was often in the hand of the leaders of criminal organization Pruszków mafia and Wołomińska mafia. At the height of the success of this music, in 1995–1997, criminal organizations controlled approx. 70 percent of the market.
Disco Polo was met with severe criticism from supporters of other musical genres, who accused it of primitiveness of music, lyrical naivety, a low level of performance and lack of originality (duplication of motifs and designs, often derived from Polish and foreign music of the 60s and 70s). These criticisms, however, did not affect the popularity of this music. Supporters of this genre and the groups performing it argue that currently professionalization of disco polo is progressing, the lyrics and music have improved, and the performers are increasingly avoiding singing from playback.
 At the same time, some of the performers from the older generation took part in the creation of mainstream disco polo or benefited its popularity (e.g., Janusz Laskowski, Marlena Drozdowska, Bohdan Smoleń, Andrzej Rosiewicz, Stan Tutaj, Marek Kondrat, Piotr Pręgowski and Cabaret OT.TO).
 In the early '90s, Krzysztof Krawczyk sang and recorded songs in the Italo disco genre, the basis from which disco polo came into being.
In some media, the term neo-disco polo is used in relation to some artists. The creators referred to by the term themselves point out that the new disco polo has an "old-school climate", but compared to the disco polo from the 1990s, there is better production and arrangement of songs.
In 2014, during the performance at the 51st National Polish Song Festival in Opole, the singer Maryla Rodowicz performed her covers of songs of this musical genre. These were the songs "You're crazy" and "Long live freedom" from the repertoire of the band Boys and the song "She dances for me" by the band Weekend.

See also 
 Euro disco
 Italo disco
 Turbo-folk

References and notes

External links 
 A Foreigner's Guide to Disco Polo

1980s in music
1990s in music
20th-century music genres
21st-century music genres
Polish styles of music
Polish music
Pop music genres
Dance-pop